Boztepe Tunnel, is a highway tunnel constructed in Ordu Province, northern Turkey.

Boztepe Tunnel is part of the Samsun-Ordu Highway   within the Black Sea Coastal Highway, of which construction was carried out by the Turkish Nurol-Yüksel-Özka–YDA joint venture. The -long twin-tube tunnel carrying two lanes of traffic in each direction is flanked by -long Asarkayası Tunnel in the west and -long Öceli Tunnel in the east on the same highway. 

The tunnel was opened to traffic on 3 March 2019 by Turkish President Recep Tayyip Erdoğan.

References

External links
 Map of road tunnels in Turkey  at General Directorate of Highways (Turkey) (KGM)

Road tunnels in Turkey
Transport in Ordu Province
Tunnels completed in 2007